The term Persecution of Orthodox Christians or Persecution of Orthodox Christianity may refer to:

 Persecution of Eastern Orthodox Christians, persecution of adherents of the Eastern Orthodox Church
 Persecution of Oriental Orthodox Christians, persecution of adherents of the Oriental Orthodox Church
 persecution of any other Christian community that self-identifies as orthodox

See also
 
 Orthodox Christianity (disambiguation)
 Orthodox Church (disambiguation)
 Orthodoxy (disambiguation)
 Orthodoxy
 Christianity